Mine is a 2009 American documentary film by Geralyn Pezanoski about pets that were abandoned during  Hurricane Katrina and efforts to reunite the pets with their owners.

Reception

The film gained a mostly positive reception from critics.

References

External links
 
 
 

2009 documentary films
2009 films
American documentary films
Documentary films about Hurricane Katrina
Documentary films about dogs
Films about cats
2000s English-language films
2000s American films